Lalmani Misra (11 August 1924 – 17 July 1979) was an Indian classical musician.

Initiation into music
Lalmani learnt Dhruvapada (Dhrupad) Dhamar in the tradition of Shankar Bhatt and Munshi Bhrigunath Lal. He learnt Khayal singing with Ustad Mehndi Hussain Khan, a disciple of Ustad Vazir Khan of Rampur Seni Gharana. He received training in Dhruvpad, Bhajan and Tabla from Swami Pramodanand; in sitar from Shri Shukdev Roy. Under the tutelage of Ustad Amir Ali Khan, he perfected several other musical instruments.

Lalmani was appointed on the post of assistant music director in Shehanshahi Recording Company, Calcutta at the age of twelve. He worked in several films for the next two years. His interaction with these two kindled an interest for orchestration in Lalmani.

Making music work

He returned to Kanpur in 1940 after his father's death. A musical prodigy himself, he experimented with ways of imparting musical training to children, at a time and place where learning of music was shunned by the chaste and noble. He opened several "Bal Sangeet Vidyalaya" – music schools for children; modified the syllabus according to the need of learner, both formal and informal; started an orchestra society. He established the reputed institution of the region, "Bharatiya Sangeet Parishad", and a music college – "Gandhi Sangeet Mahavidyalaya". Excited by all things musical he persisted in experimenting and soon his innovations in technique, style, and orchestration brought him repute and regard.

Globe-trotter
The renowned dance maestro Uday Shankar offered him the position of music director in his troupe. Lalmani Misra travelled with the troupe composing scores for innovative dance presentations and ballets on mythological and contemporary themes. The troupe covered several major towns and cities of India and covered Ceylon, France, England, Belgium, America and Canada between 1951 and 1955. Misra was adept at playing several types of musical instruments and had a knack for orchestration, which served the needs of Uday Shankar's innovative Dance troupe.

The experience with the troupe made him try his hand on stage as well. He created the Meera opera which was staged in 1956 at Kanpur. The audience was amazed by the sudden disappearance of Meera from the stage, apparently merging into the idol of Lord Krishna. Another production of this opera was presented at Varanasi at Banaras Hindu University in 1960 on the tenth anniversary of the foundation of the Music Faculty.

Music educationist
On his return, Lalmani Misra was appointed as the Registrar of "Akhil Bharatiya Gandharva Mandal Mahavidyalaya, Bombay" – the prestigious most body for Indian Classical Music education. On the pressing invitation of citizens and city officials, he resigned to join the college (Gandhi Sangeet Mahavidyalaya) he had founded in his hometown Kanpur, as its Principal in 1956.

Meanwhile, the College of Music and Fine Arts had been established by Pandit Omkarnath Thakur at Banaras Hindu University (BHU), Varanasi in 1950. By 1955–56 its teething troubles were over, and the department was ready for expansion. A scheme for its re-organization was prepared with inspiration and encouragement provided by the then Vice-Chancellor, C.P. Ramaswami Iyer. On the insistence of Pandit Omkarnath Thakur, Lalmani Misra accepted an appointment as Reader in the college and left his native Kanpur a third time for Varanasi in 1957.

Shaping higher education
Misra followed stalwart predecessors like Omkarnath Thakur and B. R. Deodhar in the Department of Performing Arts at BHU. Under his able helmsman-ship, the college increased its reputation in imparting the best education in Hindustani classical music. A rigorous hands-on course in performance and composition culminating in a doctoral degree (D.Mus.) was started which has earned faculty positions for almost all its graduates around the globe. He was a visiting Professor in music in the South Asia Studies program at the University of Pennsylvania, Philadelphia from 1969 to 1978. Many students came to learn the intricacies of music with him. Pandit Uday Shankar sent his son Ananda Shankar to Misra to learn the art of orchestration.

Writing music
Misra, apart from secretly perfecting the technique of Vichitra Veena after having heard a performance by Abdul Aziz Khan of Patiala, had carried out research on history and development of Indian musical instruments. His thesis published by Bharatiya Jnanpith, New Delhi in 1973 (second edition 2002, reprinted 2004; fifth edition 2012) under the title Bharatiya Sangeet Vadya serves as primary reference work for identification, authentication and classification of Indian musical instruments. Another important treatise first of a four-part series on techniques of strings was published as Tantri Nad. After his death in 1979 his son Gopal Shankar Misra, internationally renowned Vichitra Veena artiste and professor, Faculty of Music and Fine Arts, BHU, Varanasi worked on the remaining volumes, relying on hand-written compositions and notes of Misra. After his demise on 13 August 1999, Gopal Shankar's sister Ragini Trivedi is carrying out publication work on the unfinished books of their father. A book on essays written by Misra  – Sangeet Aur Samaj (Music and Society) edited by Omprakash Chaurasiya and Ragini Trivedi was published by Madhukali Prakashan, Bhopal in 2000.

Several authors and former students have compiled compositions in various Raga-s and Tala-s.

Raga Rupanjali & String Compositions of Twentieth Century by Pushpa Basu.

Rag Vibodh: Misrabani in two volumes, Sitar Compositions in Ome Swarlipi  by Ragini Trivedi.

For an accurate presentation of his complex Misrabani compositions, Ome Swarlipi's digital notation system was created by Misra's grandson.

Creating Raga-s

Dr Pushpa Basu has documented following Raga-s in her book.

 Madhu Bhairava. Hexatonic Raga of Bhairava Ang performed in early morning.
 Shyam Bihag. Penta-heptatonic Raga of Kalyan Thaat and Ang, performed in late evening.
 Madhukali. Penta-heptatonic Raga blending Madhuvanti, Multani and Ramkali, played in early evening.
 Sameshwari. Penta-heptatonic Raga blending Rageshri and Kalavati, played in early evening.
 Baleshwari. Hexa-hexatonic Raga blending Bageshwari and Bilaskhani Todi, played before noon.
 Jog Todi. Hexa-heptatonic Raga blending Jog and Todi, played any time due its light nature.
 Anand Bhairavai. Revived through research. Kind of Bhairavi called Madhyam-Pradhan (subdominant centric), which shuns Rishabh (supertonic)

Researcher and inventor
Carrying out research on the music of the Vedic age, he unravelled the mystery of Samic scale. To re-establish the lost notes of that period he created a Raga Sameshwari. Misra also first made it possible in the history of mankind, the twenty-two Shruti-s (not to be confused with śruti, the genre of Vedic literature) to be distinctly heard on a single Veena. The invention and key to its function have been explained in “Shruti Veena” published on 11 February 1964 by Vikram Singh, Narendra Printing Works, Varanasi.

He had created several other Raga-s like Shyam Bihag, Jog Todi, Madhukali, Madhu-Bhairav, Baleshwari etc., all in strict adherence to rigid classical norms for the creation of new Raga-s. UNESCO released a compact disc of his Vichitra Veena entitled The Music of Pandit Lalmani Misra in 1996.

True inventions are seldom noticeable. Early on, Misra found the use of Teen Tal in slow and medium compositions ubiquitous. He realised that the possibility of Chhand-s made this Tal a favourite of most instrumentalists. He experimented and created equally alluring Chhand-s in other Tal-s. Legendary percussionists were enamoured by his compositions because of their complex, oblique rhythm pattern and called it 'Koot ki Taan'. Later this style came to be known as Misrabani.

Sources and links
.Nada Rupa, Sharma, Dr. (Miss) Premlata, Ed. College of Fine Arts, B.H.U., Varanasi: 1961. Special Issue with Supplement, Vol I, No. 1, January 1961
. Sangeetendu Pandit Lalmani Ji Misra: Ek Pratibhavan Sangeetagya, Tewari, Laxmi Ganesh. Swar Sadhana, California, 1996.
.  Shruti Aur Smriti:Mahan Sangeetagya Pandit Lalmani Misra, Chourasiya, Omprakash, Ed. Madhukali Prakashan, Bhopal, August 1999.
. Sangeetendu Acharya Lalmani Misra. Vidushi Premlata Sharma
. Ethnomusicologist Dr. Laxmi Ganesh Tewari
.  Sindura on Vichitra Veena, a short movie clip on Online Music Education
.  Celestial Music of Pandit Lalmani Misra.  DVD.  Santa Rosa, California: Svar Sadhana, 2007.
.  Raga-Rupanjali. Ratna Publications: Varanasi. 2007. A collection of Compositions of Sangeetendu Dr. Lalmani Misra by Dr. Pushpa Basu.
.  Raga Vibodh: Misrabani.  Dr. Ragini Trivedi. Hindi Madhyam Karyanvaya Nideshalaya: Delhi. 2010.
.  Sitar Compositions in Ome Swarlipi.  Dr. Ragini Trivedi. 2010.
. Links to musical pieces
. Madhukali – Organization in memory of Sangeetendu Dr. Lalmani Misra

References

1924 births
1979 deaths
Academic staff of Banaras Hindu University
Hindustani instrumentalists
Indian musicologists
Indian male writers
Music theorists
William Penn University faculty
Vichitra veena players
Musicians from Varanasi
20th-century Indian musicians
20th-century musicologists